Theodore Carl Wills, Sr.  (November 28, 1911 – November 6, 2003) was a labor leader, Fresno City Council Member from 1954 to 1987 and was the mayor of Fresno from 1969 to 1977. He is the father of MLB pitcher Ted C. Wills, Jr. The Ted C. Wills Community Center in Fresno is named in his honor.

Early life
Theodore Carl Wills, Sr. was born November 28, 1911 in Sanger, California to Alexander Wills and Katherine Andreas both Volga German immigrants from Russia. On December 31, 1932, Wills married Bertha Metzler. Their child, Ted C. Wills Jr. was born February 8, 1934.

Career
Starting as a mechanic at a local creamery, Wills worked into being a labor leader amongst the local unions and was elected to serve as secretary-treasurer for the Fresno Chapter of the Creamery Employees Association in 1936. In 1954, Wills was appointed to serve on the Fresno City Commission, the predecessor to the Fresno City Council. This would start his three decade role in city politics and policy for Fresno which would include civic and policy choices such as the construction of Fulton Mall and Selland Arena. Other policies that Wills supported were the suburban growth of Fresno to help spur post-World War II growth away from the central part of the city and north towards the San Joaquin River and Madera County. In 1969, Wills would become acting mayor after Mayor Floyd H. Hyde was appointed by President Richard Nixon to the be the Under Secretary of Housing and Urban Development. Later that year he would stand and win his first term as mayor. In 1977, Wills would run for a third term as mayor however he lost the race by 117 votes to Dan Whitehurst. At the time the mayor sat on the city council, so Wills lost both the mayor race and his city council seat. Wills would run again a few years later and win to continue on the Fresno City Council. In 1987, Wills lost his District 1 seat to Craig Scharton.

Death
Ted C Wills Sr. died on November 6, 2003 from complications due to Alzheimer's disease.

References

External links

California city council members
Mayors of Fresno, California
People from Sanger, California
1911 births
2003 deaths
20th-century American politicians
Deaths from Alzheimer's disease